This article is about the rolling stock of the Swanage Railway.

Notes
 The locomotive can haul trains on Network Rail, only between River Frome and Wareham.
 Certified for full mainline use on the National Network.

Steam locomotives

Operational

Undergoing overhaul, repair or restoration

Stored

Former Swanage locomotives based elsewhere

Diesel locomotives

Operational

Undergoing overhaul, repair or restoration

DMUs

Electric Motive Power

Stored or on display

Carriages

Pre-grouping coaches

Maunsell coaches

The carriages designed by Richard Maunsell for the Southern Railway had a restrained elegance. In preservation terms they provide a superb vintage experience for the passenger, For more information see SR Maunsell carriage

Bulleid carriages

The 1940s Southern Railway designs of Oliver Bulleid produced a very clean, modern-looking carriage, many of the features of which were perpetuated in the BR standard (Mk. I) designs.

Pullman cars

British Railways standard steam stock (Mk.I)

The Backbone of most preserved railways, They are a durable design, representing in many ways the culmination of traditional carriage design in the UK, prior to the introduction of monocoque techniques.

British Railways standard stock (Mark 3)

Non-passenger coaching stock

Goods wagons

Brake vans

Covered goods vans

Open goods wagons

Flat wagons, bolster wagons and Rail and Sleeper wagons

Ballast wagons

Cranes and other special use wagons

Narrow gauge rolling stock
Most of the narrow gauge rolling stock is based at Norden Station. For a list of rolling stock, see Purbeck Mineral and Mining Museum.

References

Swanage Railway